Goodenia gracilis, commonly known as slender goodenia, is a species of flowering plant in the family Goodeniaceae and is endemic to Australia. It is an annual or perennial herb with linear to lance-shaped leaves and racemes of yellow flowers.

Description

Taxonomy and naming
Goodenia gracilis was first formally described in 1810 by Robert Brown in his Prodromus Florae Novae Hollandiae et Insulae Van Diemen. The specific epithet (gracilis) means "thin" or "slender".

Distribution and habitat
This goodenia grows in heavy, moisture-retaining soil of inland parts of New South Wales, Victoria, Queensland and scattered locations in the Northern Territory.

References

gracilis
Flora of New South Wales
Flora of Victoria (Australia)
Flora of the Northern Territory
Flora of Queensland
Plants described in 1810
Taxa named by Robert Brown (botanist, born 1773)
Endemic flora of Australia